Giovanni Aquilecchia, (known as Gianni) (28 November 1923 in Nettuno, Italy – 3 August 2001 in Camden, London, heart failure) was Professor of Italian at Bedford College, London, and the merged college with Royal Holloway, University of London. He was one of the great Italian Renaissance scholars of the second half of the 20th century.

Early life
He was the son of Vincenzo Aquilecchia, an officer in the Italian army, and his wife, Maria Letizia, née Filibeck.

He was first educated in Turin and then at the liceum Torquato Tasso, Rome. At nineteen he entered the Faculty of Letters at the University of Rome and graduated with first-class honours in 1946.

Career
From 1946 to 1949 he was a teaching assistant at the University of Rome whilst studying for a higher degree. In 1950 he became a scholar at the Warburg Institute, London. In 1951 he became an assistant in Department of Italian Studies at the University of Manchester. In 1953 he became assistant lecturer in Italian at University College London becoming Reader there from 1959 to 1961. He then returned to Manchester as Serena Professor of Italian Language and Literature till 1970. He was then appointed Professor of Italian at Bedford College 1970-85 and remained as Emeritus Professor when Bedford joined with Royal Holloway. He was unhappy with the merger and continued giving his classes in central London, until he retired in 1989.

His research was centred on Giordano Bruno and from 1996 Gianni Aquilecchia was the president of the Centro Internazionale di Studi Bruniani in Naples.

In 1996 the British Academy awarded him the Serena Medal for services towards the furtherance of the study of Italian history, literature, art or economics.

He was appointed Professor Emeritus and then honorary professor of Italian at University College London in 1998.

Personal life
In 1951 in London he married Costantina Maria Bacchetta (born c. 1929), a student. They had two sons and a daughter. The marriage was  dissolved in 1973. In 1992 he married Catherine Posford.

References

1923 births
2001 deaths
People from Nettuno
Academics of Royal Holloway, University of London
Academics of University College London
Linguists from the United Kingdom
Sapienza University of Rome alumni
Academics of the Victoria University of Manchester
Academics of Bedford College, London
20th-century linguists